Arms and the Man is an 1894 comedy play by George Bernard Shaw.

Arms and the Man may also refer to:

Arms and the Man (1932 film), a film adaptation by Cecil Lewis
Arms and the Man (1958 film), a film adaptation by Franz Peter Wirth
Arms and the Man (1983 film), a Channel 4 TV movie adaptation
Arms and the Man (magazine), title of American Rifleman from 1906 to 1923